MCK could refer to:

 Claisebrook railway station, Perth, Australia; Perth transit station code MCK
 Macair Airlines; ICAO airline code MCK
 McCook (Amtrak station), Nebraska, United States; Amtrak station code MCK
 McCook Regional Airport, Nebraska, United States; IATA airport code MCK
 McKesson Corporation; New York Stock Exchange symbol MCK
 McKinnon railway station, Melbourne, Australia; Melbourne transit station code MCK
 Medical College, Kottayam, Kerala, India
 McKinsey & Company
 Moscow Standard Time
 Marist College Kogarah, School in Sydney, Australia